Grushino is a rural locality (a selo) in Spasskoye Rural Settlement, Verkhnekhavsky District, Voronezh Oblast, Russia. The population was 124 as of 2010. There are 3 streets.

Geography 
Grushino is located 12 km west of Verkhnyaya Khava (the district's administrative centre) by road. Vishnyovka is the nearest rural locality.

References 

Rural localities in Verkhnekhavsky District